Miracle Park may refer to:
 Miracle Park (community), a Floridian religious community for sex offenders
 Miracle Park, a facility for physically and mentally challenged children in Gardendale, Alabama
 Miracles Park, a park in Detroit, see The Miracles

See also
 Miracle Beach Provincial Park, British Columbia
 Miracle Strip Amusement Park, Florida
 Miracle Strip at Pier Park, Florida